Pastoral care is an ancient model of emotional, social and spiritual support that can be found in all cultures and traditions. The term is considered inclusive of distinctly non-religious forms of support, as well as support for people from religious communities.   It is also an important form of support found in many spiritual and religious traditions.

Definition

Modern context
Pastoral care as a contemporary term is distinguished from traditional pastoral ministry, which is primarily Christian and tied to Christian beliefs. Institutional pastoral care departments in Europe are increasingly multi-faith and inclusive of non-religious, humanist approaches to providing support and comfort.

Just as the theory and philosophy behind modern pastoral care are not dependent on any one set of beliefs or traditions, pastoral care itself is guided by a broad framework. This involves personal support and outreach and is rooted in a practice of relating with the inner world of individuals from all walks of life.

In Christianity
The term pastoral ministry relates to shepherds and their role caring for sheep. Christians were the first to adopt the term for metaphorical usage, although many religions and non-religious traditions place an emphasis on care and social responsibility. In the West, pastoral ministry has since expanded into pastoral care embracing many different religions and non-religious beliefs.

The Bible does not explicitly define the role of a pastor but associates it with teaching.
Pastoral ministry involves shepherding the flock.
…Shepherding involves protection, tending to needs, strengthening the weak, encouragement, feeding the flock, making provision, shielding, refreshing, restoring, leading by example to move people on in their pursuit of holiness, comforting, guiding (Pss 78: 52; 23).Cure of souls: In some denominations of Christianity, the cure of souls, an archaic translation which is better rendered today as "care of souls"  is the exercise by a priest of his office. This typically embraces instruction, by sermons,  admonitions and administration of sacraments, to the congregation over which he has authority from the church. In countries where the Roman Catholic Church acted as the national church, the "cure" was not only over a congregation or congregations, but over a district. The assignment of a priest to a district subdividing a diocese was a process begun in the 4th century AD. The term parish as applied to this district comes from the Greek word for district, .

Humanist and non-religious
Humanist groups, which act on behalf of non-religious people, have developed pastoral care offerings in response to growing demand for the provision of like-minded support from populations undergoing rapid secularisation, such as the UK. Humanists UK for example manages the Non-Religious Pastoral Support Network, a network of trained and accredited volunteers and professionals who operate throughout prisons, hospitals, and universities in the UK. The terms pastoral care and pastoral support are preferred because these sound less religious than terms such as chaplaincy. Surveys have shown that more than two thirds of patients support non-religious pastoral care being available in British institutions. Similar offerings are available from humanist groups around Europe and North America.

Pastoral care vs pastoral ministry

Pastoral ministry

Catholicism
In Catholic theology, pastoral ministry for the sick and infirm is one of the most significant ways that members of the Body of Christ continue the ministry and mission of Jesus. Pastoral ministry is considered to be the responsibility of all the baptized. Understood in the broad sense of "helping others," pastoral ministry is the responsibility of all Christians. Sacramental pastoral ministry is the administration of the sacraments (Baptism, Confirmation, Eucharist, Penance, Extreme Unction, Holy Orders, Matrimony) that is reserved to consecrated priests except for Baptism (in an emergency, anyone can baptize) and marriage, where the spouses are the ministers and the priest is the witness. Pastoral ministry was understood differently at different times in history. A significant development occurred after the Fourth Lateran Council in 1215 (more on this in the link to Father Boyle's lecture below). The Second Vatican Council (Vatican II) applied the word "pastoral" to a variety of situations involving care of souls; on this point, go to the link to Monsignor Gherardini's lecture).

Many Catholic parishes employ lay ecclesial ministers as "pastoral associates" or "pastoral assistants", lay people who serve in ministerial or administrative roles, assisting the priest in his work, but who are not ordained clerics. They are responsible, among other things, for the spiritual care of frail and housebound as well as for running a multitude of tasks associated with the sacramental life of the Church. If priests have the necessary qualifications in counseling or in psychotherapy, they may offer professional psychological services when they give pastoral counseling as part of their pastoral ministry of souls. However, the church hierarchy under John Paul II and Benedict XVI has emphasized that the Sacrament of Penance, or Reconciliation, is for the forgiveness of sins and not counseling and as such should not be confused with or incorporated into the therapy given to a person by a priest, even if the therapist priest is also their confessor. The two processes, both of which are privileged and confidential under civil and canon law, are separate by nature.

Youth workers and youth ministers are also finding a place within parishes, and this involves their spirituality.  It is common for Youth workers/ministers to be involved in pastoral ministry and are required to have a qualification in counseling before entering into this arm of ministry.

Orthodoxy
The priesthood obligations of Orthodox clergymen are outlined by John Chrysostom (347–407) in his treatise On the Priesthood. It is perhaps the first pastoral work written, although he was only a deacon when he penned it. It stresses the dignity of the priesthood. The priest, it says, is greater than kings, angels, or parents, but priests are for that reason most tempted to pride and ambition. They, more than anyone else, need clear and unshakable wisdom, patience that disarms pride, and exceptional prudence in dealing with souls.

Protestantism

There are many assumptions about what a pastor's ministry is. The core practices of a pastor's ministry in mainline Protestant churches include leading worship, preaching, pastoral care, outreach, and supporting the work of the congregation. Theological Seminaries provide a curriculum that supports these key facets of ministry. Pastors are often expected to also be involved in local ministries, such as hospital chaplaincy, visitation, funerals, weddings and organizing religious activities. "Pastoral ministry" iincludes outreach, encouragement, support, counseling and other care for members and friends of the congregation. In many churches, there are groups like deacons that provide outreach and support, often led and supported by the pastor. 

For example, the Evangelical Wesleyan Church instructs clergy with the following words: "We should endeavor to assist those under our ministry, and to aid in the salvation of souls by instructing them in their homes. ... Family religion is waning in many branches. And what avails public preaching alone, though we could preach like angels? We must, yea, every traveling preacher must instruct the people from house to house."   The Presbyterian Church (USA) is structured so that there is parity between lay leaders and pastors. Deacons and elders are ordained, with specific duties.

See also

 Clearness committee
 Clinical pastoral education
 Faith healing
 Holistic health

References

Bibliography
 Arnold, Bruce Makoto, "Shepherding a Flock of a Different Fleece: A Historical and Social Analysis of the Unique Attributes of the African American Pastoral Caregiver". The Journal of Pastoral Care and Counseling, Vol. 66, No. 2. (June 2012)  
 Multi-faith Centre, University of Canberra, 2013
 Henri Nouwen, Spiritual Direction (San Francisco, HarperOne, 2006).
 Emmanuel Yartekwei Lartey, Pastoral Theology in an Intercultural World (Cleveland, (OH), Pilgrim Press, 2006).
 Neil Pembroke, Renewing Pastoral Practice: Trinitarian Perspectives on Pastoral Care and Counselling (Ashgate, Aldershot, 2006) (Explorations in Practical, Pastoral and Empirical Theology).
 Beth Allison Barr, The Pastoral Care of Women in Late Medieval England (Rochester, NY: Boydell Press, 2008) (Gender in the Middle Ages, 3).
 George R. Ross, Evaluating Models of Christian Counseling (Eugene (OR), Wipf and Stock, 2011).
 Hamer, Dean (2004). The God Gene: How Faith is Hardwired into Our Genes. New York: Doubleday. .

External links
  St. Thomas Aquinas and the Third Millennium, by Leonard Boyle.
  The Pastoral Nature of Vatican II: An Evaluation, by Brunero Gherardini. Translation of: Sull'indole pastorale del Vaticano II: una valutazione in Concilio Vaticano II, un concilio pastorale (Frigento, Italy: Casa Mariana Editrice, 2011).

Christian religious occupations
Christian terminology
Religion and health